Anika is a feminine given name. It may also refer to:

 Anika (musician), British-German singer and journalist Annika Henderson (born 1987)
 Anika (album), her self-titled album
 Jerlin Anika (born 2004), Indian deaf badminton player
 Cyclone Anika, two tropical cyclones